Óscar Haret Ortega Gatica (born 19 May 2000) is a Mexican professional footballer who plays as a centre-back for Liga MX club Toluca.

Club career

América
On 24 March 2018, Ortega's debut for Mexican side Club América came on a friendly game coming in as a sub on the 68th minute for Enrique Cedillo against Club Tijuana.  The game ended on a 2–2 draw and he was wearing number 29.

On 18 January 2020, Ortega made his official Liga MX debut playing the full match for Club América against Tigres UANL after it was announced that Bruno Valdez was ineligible to start the match due to injury.

Toluca
On 17 June 2020, Ortega joined Liga MX side Deportivo Toluca on a loan agreement for the remainder of the season with the option for a permanent deal.

International career
On 27 October 2021, Ortega made his senior national team debut under Gerardo Martino in a friendly match against Ecuador.

Career statistics

Club

International

Honours
Mexico U17
CONCACAF U-17 Championship: 2017

References

2000 births
Living people
Mexican footballers
Club América footballers
Liga MX players
Association football defenders
Mexico international footballers
Mexico youth international footballers
People from Iguala
Footballers from Guerrero